William Austin House may refer to:

 William Austin House (Trumansburg, New York), listed on the NRHP in Tompkins County, New York
 William Austin House (Park City, Utah), listed on the National Register of Historic Places in Summit County, Utah